Elvis Kyei Baffour (born 7 February 1999) is a Ghanaian professional footballer who plays as winger for Tunisian side AS Soliman. He previously played for Liberty Professionals.

Club career

Rainbow FC 
Baffour was born in Kumasi and he played for Kumasi-based lower-tier side Rainbow FC before joining Liberty in 2017.

Liberty Professionals 
Baffour started his professional career with Dansoman-based club Liberty Professionals. He made his Ghana Premier League debut during the 2018 Ghana Premier League season. He made his debut on 25 March 2018 in a 1–3 loss to West African Football Academy (WAFA), in the process playing the full 90 minutes. On 11 April 2018, he scored his debut goal by scoring the only goal in a match against Ashanti Gold to grant Liberty their second victory in 4 days after going on a losing streak in 3 matches. The season was cut short due the Anas Number 12 Expose which caused the dissolution of the GFA. Due to that, he finished the season with 8 matches and a goal.

During the 2019 GFA Normalization Competition, played 11 matches and scored 4 goals for the Scientific Soccer Boys. He established himself as a fan favourite within this period. He scored 8 goals and provided 4 assists in his 15 league appearances for the Dansoman-based club during the 2019–20 season before the league was cancelled due to the COVID-19 pandemic, ending the season as the club's top goal scorer and 4th joint league top scorer. At the end of these truncated season, he was linked with a move to UAE giants Al Ain, however he joined Tunisian side AS Soliman. In his 3-year stay with the club he played 34 league matches scored 13 goals and made 4 assists.

AS Soliman 
On 12 October 2020, Baffour joined Tunisian side AS Soliman. He signed a 3-year contract with the club after passing his medicals. In a 2–1 victory over Etoile du Sahel on 18 December 200, he made his debut by playing the full 90 minutes of the game. He scored his debut goal for the club on 31 January 2021 by opening the scoreline in the 37th minute in an eventual 1–1 draw against CS Sfaxien.

International career 
Kyei Baffour has earned call-ups to the Ghana U-20 and U-23 teams.

References

External links 
 
 
 
 

1999 births
Living people
Association football forwards
Liberty Professionals F.C. players
AS Soliman players
Ghanaian footballers
Ghanaian expatriate sportspeople in Tunisia
Ghana Premier League players
Expatriate footballers in Tunisia
Tunisian Ligue Professionnelle 1 players
People from Kumasi
Akan people